Bregbo is a town in south-eastern Ivory Coast. It is a suburb of Abidjan. The town is about 20 kilometres east of Abidjan and lies on the Ébrié Lagoon.

Notes

Sub-prefectures of Abidjan
Communes of Abidjan